MS Scandinavia may refer to the following ships:

 , launched in 1979 and served under this name until 1982 when she was renamed Tzarevetz
 , a cruiseferry launched in 1981, renamed Stardancer in 1985,  Viking Serenade in 1990 and converted to a cruise ship in 1991. Subsequently renamed as Island Escape in 2002 and  then  Ocean Gala in 2015. She was scrapped under the  name Ocean Gala 1 in 2018.
 , a cruiseferry launched in 1980 as Visby she  was in operation as Scandinavia between 2003 and 2015 and renamed Rigel II in 2015

Ship names